Primordial black holes (also abbreviated as PBH) are hypothetical black holes that formed soon after the Big Bang. Due to the extreme environment of the newly born universe, extremely dense pockets of sub-atomic matter had been tightly packed to the point of gravitational collapse, creating a primordial black hole that bypasses the density needed to make black holes today due to the densely packed, high-energy state present in the moments just after the Big Bang. Seeing as the creation of primordial black holes pre-date the creation of known stars, they can be formed with less mass than what are known as stellar black holes. Yakov Borisovich Zel'dovich and Igor Dmitriyevich Novikov in 1966 first proposed the existence of such black holes, while the first in-depth study was conducted by Stephen Hawking in 1971. However, their existence has not been proven and remains theoretical.

Theoretical history 

However, primordial black holes originally having mass lower than  would not have survived to the present due to Hawking radiation, which causes complete evaporation in a time much shorter than the age of the Universe. Primordial black holes are non-baryonic, and as such are plausible dark matter candidates. Primordial black holes are also good candidates for being the seeds of the supermassive black holes at the center of massive galaxies, as well as of intermediate-mass black holes.

Primordial black holes belong to the class of massive compact halo objects (MACHOs). They are naturally a good dark matter candidate: they are (nearly) collision-less and stable (if sufficiently massive), they have non-relativistic velocities, and they form very early in the history of the Universe (typically less than one second after the Big Bang). Nevertheless, critics maintain that tight limits on their abundance have been set up from various astrophysical and cosmological observations, which would exclude that they contribute significantly to dark matter over most of the plausible mass range. However, new research has provided for the possibility again, whereby these black holes would sit in clusters with a 30-solar-mass primordial black hole at the center.

In March 2016, one month after the announcement of the detection by Advanced LIGO/VIRGO of gravitational waves emitted by the merging of two 30 solar mass black holes (about ), three groups of researchers proposed independently that the detected black holes had a primordial origin. Two of the groups found that the merging rates inferred by LIGO are consistent with a scenario in which all the dark matter is made of primordial black holes, if a non-negligible fraction of them are somehow clustered within halos such as faint dwarf galaxies or globular clusters, as expected by the standard theory of cosmic structure formation. The third group claimed that these merging rates are incompatible with an all-dark-matter scenario and that primordial black holes could only contribute to less than one percent of the total dark matter. The unexpected large mass of the black holes detected by LIGO has strongly revived interest in primordial black holes with masses in the range of 1 to 100 solar masses. It is still debated whether this range is excluded or not by other observations, such as the absence of micro-lensing of stars, the cosmic microwave background anisotropies, the size of faint dwarf galaxies, and the absence of correlation between X-ray and radio sources towards the galactic center.

In May 2016, Alexander Kashlinsky suggested that the observed spatial correlations in the unresolved gamma-ray and X-ray background radiations could be due to primordial black holes with similar masses, if their abundance is comparable to that of dark matter.

In April 2019, a study was published suggesting this hypothesis may be a dead end. An international team of researchers has put a theory speculated by the late Stephen Hawking to its most rigorous test to date, and their results have ruled out the possibility that primordial black holes smaller than a tenth of a millimeter (7 × 1022 kg) make up most of dark matter.

In August 2019, a study was published opening up the possibility of making up all dark matter with asteroid-mass primordial black holes (3.5 × 10−17 – 4 × 10−12 solar masses, or 7 × 1013 – 8 × 1018 kg).

In September 2019, a report by James Unwin and Jakub Scholtz proposed the possibility of a primordial black hole (PBH) with mass 5–15  (Earth masses), about the diameter of a tennis ball, existing in the extended Kuiper Belt to explain the orbital anomalies that are theorized to be the result of a 9th planet in the solar system.

Formation 

Primordial black holes could have formed in the very early Universe (less than one second after the Big Bang), during the so-called radiation dominated era. The essential ingredient for the formation of a primordial black hole is a fluctuation in the density of the Universe, inducing its gravitational collapse. One typically requires density contrasts  (where  is the density of the Universe) to form a black hole. There are several mechanisms able to produce such inhomogeneities in the context of cosmic inflation (in hybrid inflation models, for example axion inflation), reheating, or cosmological phase transitions.

Observational limits and detection strategies 

A variety of observations have been interpreted to place limits on the abundance and mass of primordial black holes:

 Lifetime, Hawking radiation and gamma-rays:  One way to detect primordial black holes, or to constrain their mass and abundance, is by their Hawking radiation. Stephen Hawking theorized in 1974 that large numbers of such smaller primordial black holes might exist in the Milky Way in our galaxy's halo region. All black holes are theorized to emit Hawking radiation at a rate inversely proportional to their mass. Since this emission further decreases their mass, black holes with very small mass would experience runaway evaporation, creating a burst of radiation at the final phase, equivalent to a hydrogen bomb yielding millions of megatons of explosive force. A regular black hole (of about 3 solar masses) cannot lose all of its mass within the current age of the universe (they would take about 1069 years to do so, even without any matter falling in). However, since primordial black holes are not formed by stellar core collapse, they may be of any size. A black hole with a mass of about 1011 kg would have a lifetime about equal to the age of the universe. If such low-mass black holes were created in sufficient number in the Big Bang, we should be able to observe explosions by some of those that are relatively nearby in our own Milky Way galaxy. NASA's Fermi Gamma-ray Space Telescope satellite, launched in June 2008, was designed in part to search for such evaporating primordial black holes.  Fermi data set up the limit that less than one percent of dark matter could be made of primordial black holes with masses up to 1013 kg. Evaporating primordial black holes would have also had an impact on the Big Bang nucleosynthesis and change the abundances of light elements in the Universe.  However, if theoretical Hawking radiation does not actually exist, such primordial black holes would be extremely difficult, if not impossible, to detect in space due to their small size and lack of large gravitational influence.
 Lensing of gamma-ray bursts:  Compact objects can induce a change in the luminosity of gamma-ray bursts when passing close to their line of sight, through the gravitational lensing effect. The Fermi Gamma-Ray Burst Monitor experiment found that primordial black holes cannot contribute importantly to the dark matter within the mass range 5 x 1014 – 1017 kg. A re-analysis, however, has removed this limit after properly taking into account the extended nature of the source as well as wave optics effects.
 Capture of primordial black holes by neutron stars:  If primordial black holes with masses between 1015 kg and 1022 kg had abundances comparable to that of dark matter, neutron stars in globular clusters should have captured some of them, leading to the rapid destruction of the star.   The observation of neutron stars in globular clusters can thus be used to set a limit on primordial black hole abundance. However, a detailed study of the capture dynamics has challenged this limit and led to its removal.
 Survival of white dwarfs: If a primordial black hole passes through a C/O white dwarf, it may ignite the carbon and subsequently produce a runaway explosion. The observed white dwarf mass distribution can thus provide a limit on primordial black hole abundance. Primordial black holes in the range of ~1016–1017 kg have been ruled out for being a dominant constituent of the local dark matter density. Furthermore, the runaway explosion may be seen as a Type Ia supernova. Primordial black holes in the mass range 1017–1019 kg are limited by the observed supernova rate, though these bounds are subject to astrophysical uncertainties. A detailed study with hydrodynamic simulations have challenged these limits and led to the re-opening of these mass ranges.
Micro-lensing of stars:  If a primordial black hole passes between us and a distant star, it induces a magnification of these stars due to the gravitational lensing effect.  By monitoring the magnitude of stars in the Magellanic Clouds, the EROS and MACHO surveys have put a limit on the abundance of primordial black holes in the range 1023–1031 kg. By observing stars in the Andromeda Galaxy (M31), the Subaru/HSC have put a limit on the abundance of primordial black holes in the range 1019–1024 kg. According to these surveys, primordial black holes within this range cannot constitute an important fraction of the dark matter. However, these limits are model-dependent. It has been also argued that if primordial black holes are regrouped in dense halos, the micro-lensing constraints are then naturally evaded. The micro-lensing technique suffers from the finite-size source effect and the diffraction when probing primordial black holes with smaller masses. Scaling laws were derived to demonstrate that the optical micro-lensing is unlikely to limit the abundance of primordial black holes with masses below ~1018 kg in a foreseeable future.
Micro-lensing of Ia supernovae: Primordial black holes with masses larger than 1028 kg would magnify distant type Ia supernova (or any other standard candle of known luminosity) due to gravitational lensing. These effects would be apparent if primordial black holes were a significant contribution to the dark matter density, which is constrained by current data sets.
  Temperature anisotropies in the cosmic microwave background:  Accretion of matter onto primordial black holes in the early Universe should lead to energy injection in the medium that affects the recombination history of the Universe.  This effect induces signatures in the statistical distribution of the cosmic microwave background (CMB) anisotropies.  The Planck observations of the CMB exclude that primordial black holes with masses in the range 100–104 solar masses contribute importantly to the dark matter, at least in the simplest conservative model.  It is still debated whether the constraints are stronger or weaker in more realistic or complex scenarios.
  Gamma-ray signatures from annihilating dark matter: If the dark matter in the Universe is in the form of weakly interacting massive particles or WIMPs, primordial black holes would accrete a halo of WIMPs around them in the early universe. The annihilation of WIMPs in the halo leads to a signal in the gamma-ray spectrum which is potentially detectable by dedicated instruments such as the Fermi Gamma-ray Space Telescope.

At the time of the detection by LIGO of the gravitational waves emitted during the final coalescence of two 30 solar mass black holes, the mass range between 10 and 100 solar masses was still only poorly constrained. Since then, new observations have been claimed to close this window, at least for models in which the primordial black holes have all the same mass:
 from the absence of X-ray and optical correlations in point sources observed in the direction of the galactic center.
 from the dynamical heating of dwarf galaxies
 from the observation of a central star cluster in the Eridanus II dwarf galaxy (but these constraints can be relaxed if Eridanus II owns a central intermediate mass black hole, which is suggested by some observations).  If primordial black holes exhibit a broad mass distribution, those constraints could nevertheless still be evaded.
 from the gravitational micro-lensing of distant quasars by closer galaxies, allowing only 20% of the galactic matter to be in the form of compact objects with stellar masses, a value consistent with the expected stellar population.
 from micro-lensing of distant stars by galaxy clusters, suggesting that the fraction of dark matter in the form of primordial black holes with masses comparable to those found by LIGO must be less than 10%.

In the future, new limits will be set up by various observations:
 The Square Kilometre Array (SKA) radio telescope will probe the effects of primordial black holes on the reionization history of the Universe, due to energy injection into the intergalactic medium, induced by matter accretion onto primordial black holes.
 LIGO, VIRGO and future gravitational waves detectors will detect new black hole merging events, from which one could reconstruct the mass distribution of primordial black holes.  These detectors could allow distinguishing unambiguously between primordial or stellar origins if merging events involving black holes with a mass lower than 1.4 solar mass are detected. Another way would be to measure the large orbital eccentricity of primordial black hole binaries.
  Gravitational wave detectors, such as the Laser Interferometer Space Antenna (LISA) and pulsar timing arrays will also probe the stochastic background of gravitational waves emitted by primordial black hole binaries, when they are still orbiting relatively far from each other.
 New detections of faint dwarf galaxies, and the observations of their central star cluster, could be used to test the hypothesis that these dark matter-dominated structures contain primordial black holes in abundance.
 Monitoring star positions and velocities within the Milky Way could be used to detect the influence of a nearby primordial black hole.
 It has been suggested that a small black hole passing through the Earth would produce a detectable acoustic signal.  Because of its tiny diameter, large mass compared to a nucleon, and relatively high speed, such primordial black holes would simply transit Earth virtually unimpeded with only a few impacts on nucleons, exiting the planet with no ill effects.
 Another way to detect primordial black holes could be by watching for ripples on the surfaces of stars.  If the black hole passed through a star, its density would cause observable vibrations.
 Monitoring quasars in the microwave wavelength and detection of the wave optics feature of gravitational microlensing by the primordial black holes.
 The other observational consequence would be the collision of primordial black holes with Earth and being trapped inside it that is studied by S. Rahvar in 2021. Considering the whole dark matter is made of primordial blackholes with the mass function allowed in the observational range, the probability of this event is much smaller than the age of the Universe.

Implications 

Problems deemed to be related to the existence of primordial black holes include the dark matter problem, the cosmological domain wall problem and the cosmological monopole problem. Since primordial black holes do not necessarily have to be small (they can have any size), they may have contributed to the later formation of galaxies. While evidence that primordial black holes may constitute dark matter is inconclusive as of 2023, researchers such as Bernard Carr and others are strong proponents.

Even if they do not solve these problems, the low number of primordial black holes (as of 2010, only two intermediate mass black holes were confirmed) aids cosmologists by putting constraints on the spectrum of density fluctuations in the early universe.

String theory 

General relativity predicts the smallest primordial black holes would have evaporated by now, but if there were a fourth spatial dimension – as predicted by string theory – it would affect how gravity acts on small scales and "slow down the evaporation quite substantially". In essence, the energy stored in the fourth spatial dimension as a stationary wave would bestow a significant rest mass to the object when regarded in the conventional four-dimensional space-time. This could mean there are several thousand black holes in our galaxy. To test this theory, scientists will use the Fermi Gamma-ray Space Telescope which was put in orbit by NASA on June 11, 2008. If they observe specific small interference patterns within gamma-ray bursts, it could be the first indirect evidence for primordial black holes and string theory.

See also 
 List of black holes
 List of nearest black holes
 Primordial gravitational wave
 Primordial fluctuations
 Direct collapse black hole

References 

 S.W. Hawking, Commun.Math. Phys. 43 (1975) 199 : Original article proposing existence of radiation
 D. Page, Phys. Rev. D13 (1976) 198 : First detailed studies of the evaporation mechanism
 B.J. Carr & S.W. Hawking, Mon. Not. Roy. Astron. Soc 168 (1974) 399 : Describes links between primordial black holes and the early universe
 A. Barrau et al., Astron. Astrophys. 388 (2002) 676, Astron. Astrophys. 398 (2003) 403, Astrophys. J. 630 (2005) 1015 : Experimental searches for primordial black holes due to the emitted antimatter
 A. Barrau & G. Boudoul, Review talk given at the International Conference on Theoretical Physics TH2002 : Cosmology with primordial black holes
 A. Barrau & J. Grain, Phys. Lett. B 584 (2004) 114 : Searches for new physics (quantum gravity) with primordial black holes
 P. Kanti, Int. J. Mod. Phys. A19 (2004) 4899 : Evaporating black holes and extra-dimensions

Physical cosmology
Black holes